Richard Stanton (1876–1956) was an American actor.

Richard Stanton may also refer to:

Richard H. Stanton (1812–1891), American politician, lawyer, editor and judge
Richard Stanton-Jones (1926–1991), British aeronautical engineer
Rick Stanton (Richard William Stanton, born 1961/62), British firefighter and cave diver